The Chinese women's national sevens rugby union team were the 2014 Asian women's sevens champions. They qualified for the 2018 Rugby World Cup Sevens after finishing the 2017 Asia Rugby Women's Sevens Series in second place, they placed 12th overall at the World Cup. China qualified for the 2020 Olympics at the 2019 Asia Rugby Women's Sevens Olympic Qualifying Tournament.

Tournament history

Rugby World Cup Sevens

Summer Olympics

Asian Games

Players

Current squad

China's roster of 13 athletes to the 2020 Olympics is as follows.

Head coach: Euan Mackintosh

Chen Keyi
Gu Yaoyao
Liu Xiaoqian
Ruan Hongting
Tang Minglin
Wang Wanyu
Wu Juan
Xu Xiaoyan
Yan Meiling
Yang Feifei
Yang Min (c)
Yu Liping
Yu Xiaoming

Previous squads

● Yao Jiyan ● Sun Tingting ● Zhao Wenqing ● Yu Xiaoming ● Chen Ming ● Zhou Jiaxin ● Liu Yang ● Chen Keyi ● Guan Qishi ● Sun Shichao ● Zhao Xinqi ● Yang Min

References

Women's national rugby sevens teams
China national rugby union team
Asian national women's rugby union teams